Gunibsky District is an administrative and municipal district (raion), one of the forty-one in the Republic of Daghestan, Russia. It is located in the center of the republic. Its administrative center is the rural locality (a selo) of Gunib. As of the 2010 Census, the total population of the district was 25,303, with the population of Gunib accounting for 9.0% of that number.

History
Gunib was historically important as a natural fortress during the Caucasian War of the 19th century. Imam Shamil, leader of the Chechen and Dagestani tribes, made his last stand against the Russians at Gunib, where he gave himself up to the Russian commander, Prince Aleksandr Baryatinsky, on August 25, 1859.

Gunibsky Canton in the borders of modern Gunibsky District was established in 1928. It was transformed into a district along with other cantons on June 3, 1929.

Administrative and municipal status
Within the framework of administrative divisions, Gunibsky District is one of the forty-one in the Republic of Dagestan. The district is divided into ten selsoviets which comprise sixty-seven rural localities. As a municipal division, the district is incorporated as Gunibsky Municipal District. Its ten selsoviets are incorporated as eighteen rural settlements within the municipal district. The selo of Gunib serves as the administrative center of both the administrative and municipal district.

References

Notes

Sources

Districts of Dagestan
States and territories established in 1929